Northern Irish nationalism may refer to:

 Ulster nationalism, movement that seeks the independence of Northern Ireland from the United Kingdom without joining the Republic of Ireland.
 Irish nationalism, movement which asserts that the whole island of Ireland should be a sovereign state.